Fantastica Mania 2017 was a professional wrestling tour, co-produced by the Japanese New Japan Pro-Wrestling (NJPW) promotion and the Mexican Consejo Mundial de Lucha Libre (CMLL) promotion. The tour took place between January 13 and 22, 2017, with shows taking place in Osaka, Matsuyama, Kyoto, Nagoya and Tokyo, Japan. The 2017 shows were the seventh time that NJPW and CMLL co-promoted shows in Japan under the Fantastica Mania name. With seven shows, the 2017 tour was the longest in Fantastica Mania history. The shows featured seven matches each, including two matches contested for championships owned by CMLL.

Background
The 2017 Fantastica Mania tour was the seventh year in a row where Japanese wrestling promotion New Japan Pro-Wrestling (NJPW) promoted a series of shows in Japan alongside their Mexican partner promotion Consejo Mundial de Lucha Libre (CMLL). The 2017 tour was shows 25 to 31, a total of seven shows.

The tour was officially announced on October 24, 2016. Originally, NJPW confirmed the locations of six shows with a seventh pending confirmation. The seventh show was officially announced on November 4. The shows take place in Osaka, Kyoto and Tokyo, all of which had previously hosted Fantastica Mania events, as well as Matsuyama and Nagoya, which host their first events. The three final shows in Tokyo would air live through NJPW's internet streaming site, NJPW World.

NJPW announced the CMLL wrestlers taking part in the tour on October 30. Included were returning wrestlers Atlantis, Bárbaro Cavernario, Dragon Lee, Euforia, Hechicero, Máximo Sexy, Místico, Okumura, Stuka Jr., Titán, Último Guerrero and Volador Jr. and debuting wrestlers Blue Panther Jr., Ephesto, Raziel and Soberano Jr. Also announced for the tour was CMLL ring announcer Evan. On November 21, Rush was added to the tour, three days after he had made his surprise return to NJPW as part of the 2016 World Tag League.

The cards for the events were released by the two promotions on January 5, 2017, (Mexican time) and January 6 (Japanese time). The tour would include two title matches, contested for championships owned by CMLL. On January 20, Dragon Lee would defend the CMLL World Lightweight Championship against Bárbaro Cavernario and on January 21, Máximo Sexy would defend the CMLL World Heavyweight Championship against Hechicero.

Results

January 13

January 14

January 15

January 16

January 20

January 21

January 22

See also
2017 in professional wrestling

References

External links
Fantastica Mania 2017 on NJPW.co.jp 

2017 in Tokyo
2017 in professional wrestling
2017
January 2017 events in Japan